Benjamin West,  (October 10, 1738 – March 11, 1820) was a British-American artist who painted famous historical scenes such as The Death of Nelson, The Death of General Wolfe, the Treaty of Paris, and Benjamin Franklin Drawing Electricity from the Sky.

Entirely self-taught, West soon gained valuable patronage and toured Europe, eventually settling in London. He impressed King George III and was largely responsible for the launch of the Royal Academy, of which he became the second president (after Sir Joshua Reynolds). He was appointed historical painter to the court and Surveyor of the King's Pictures.

West also painted religious subjects, as in his huge work The Preservation of St Paul after a Shipwreck at Malta, at the Chapel of St Peter and St Paul at the Old Royal Naval College in Greenwich, and Christ Healing the Sick, presented to the National Gallery.

Early life

West was born in Springfield, Pennsylvania, in a house that is now in the borough of Swarthmore on the campus of Swarthmore College. He was the tenth child of an innkeeper and his wife. The family later moved to Newtown Square, Pennsylvania, where his father was the proprietor of the Square Tavern, still standing in that town.

West told the novelist John Galt, with whom, late in his life, he collaborated on a memoir, The Life and Studies of Benjamin West (1816, 1820), that, when he was a child, Native Americans showed him how to make paint by mixing some clay from the river bank with bear grease in a pot. West was an autodidact; while excelling at the arts, "he had little [formal] education and, even when president of the Royal Academy, could scarcely spell". One day, his mother left him alone with his little sister Sally. Benjamin discovered some bottles of ink and began to paint Sally's portrait. When his mother came home, she noticed the painting, picked it up and said, “Why, it's Sally!” and kissed him. Later, he noted, "My mother's kiss made me a painter."

From 1746 to 1759, West worked in Pennsylvania, mostly painting portraits.  While West was in Lancaster in 1756, his patron, a gunsmith named William Henry, encouraged him to paint a Death of Socrates based on an engraving in Charles Rollin's Ancient History. His resulting composition, which significantly differs from the source, has been called "the most ambitious and interesting painting produced in colonial America". Dr William Smith, then the provost of the College of Philadelphia, saw the painting in Henry's house and decided to become West's patron, offering him education and, more importantly, connections with wealthy and politically connected Pennsylvanians.  During this time West met John Wollaston, a famous painter who had immigrated from London. West learned Wollaston's techniques for painting the shimmer of silk and satin, and also adopted some of "his mannerisms, the most prominent of which was to give all his subjects large almond-shaped eyes, which clients thought very chic".

West was a close friend of Benjamin Franklin, whose portrait he painted. Franklin was the godfather of West's second son, Benjamin.

Italian tour

Sponsored by Smith and William Allen, then reputed to be the wealthiest man in Philadelphia, West traveled to Italy in 1760 in the company of the Scot William Patoun, a painter who later became an art collector. In common with many artists, architects, and lovers of the fine arts at that time he conducted a Grand Tour. West expanded his repertoire by copying works of Italian painters such as Titian and Raphael direct from the originals.
In Rome he met a number of international neo-classical artists including German-born Anton Rafael Mengs, Scottish Gavin Hamilton, and Austrian Angelica Kauffman.

England

In August 1763, West arrived in England,  on what he initially intended as a visit on his way back to America.  In fact, he never returned to America.  He stayed for a month at Bath with William Allen, who was also in the country, and visited his half-brother Thomas West at Reading at the urging of his father. In London he was introduced to Richard Wilson and his student Joshua Reynolds. He moved into a house in Bedford Street, Covent Garden. The first picture he painted in England, Angelica and Medora, along with a portrait of General Robert Monckton, and his Cymon and Iphigenia, painted in Rome, were shown at the exhibition in Spring Gardens in 1764.

In 1765, he married Elizabeth Shewell, an American he engaged in Philadelphia, at St Martin-in-the-Fields.

Dr Markham, then Headmaster of Westminster School, introduced West to Samuel Johnson, Edmund Burke,   Thomas Newton, Bishop of Bristol, James Johnson, Bishop of Worcester, and Robert Hay Drummond, Archbishop of York. All three prelates commissioned work from him. In 1766 West proposed a scheme to decorate St Paul's Cathedral with paintings. It was rejected by the Bishop of London, but his idea of painting an altarpiece for St Stephen Walbrook was accepted. At around this time he also received acclaim for his classical subjects, such as Orestes and Pylades  and The Continence of Scipio.

West was known in England as the "American Raphael". His Raphaelesque painting of Archangel Michael Binding the Devil is in the collection of Trinity College, Cambridge. He said that "Art is the representation of human beauty, ideally perfect in design, graceful and noble in attitude."

Royal patronage
Drummond tried to raise subscriptions to fund an annuity for West, so that he could give up portraiture and devote himself entirely to more ambitious compositions. Having failed in this, he tried—with greater success—to convince King George III to patronise West.  West was soon on good terms with the king, and the two men conducted long discussions on the state of art in England, including the idea of the establishment of a Royal Academy. The academy came into being in 1768, with West one of the primary leaders of an opposition group formed out of the existing Society of Artists of Great Britain; Joshua Reynolds was its first president. In the same year, he was elected to membership in the American Philosophical Society. In a story related by Henry Angelo I (1756–1835) in his book of reminiscences, the actor David Garrick, who was a friend of Angelo's father, the Italian sword master Domenico Angelo, memorably sketched for the teenaged Henry the following exchange: one day the painter Francesco Zuccarelli, on one of his visits to Domenico, got into a dispute with his fellow royal academician Johan Zoffany about the merit of West's 1769 painting The Departure of Regulus, his first commission for the king.  Zuccarelli exclaimed, "Here is a painter who promises to rival Nicolas Poussin", while Zoffany tauntingly replied, "A figo for Poussin, West has already beaten him out of the field."

In 1772, King George appointed him historical painter to the court at an annual fee of £1,000.  He painted a series of eight large canvases showing episodes from the life of Edward III for St George's Hall at Windsor Castle, and proposed a cycle of 36 works on the theme of "the progress of revealed religion" for a chapel at the castle, of which 28 were eventually executed. The largest group of paintings (seven) from the series is currently in Greenville, SC. He also painted nine portraits of members of the royal family,  including two of the king himself. He was Surveyor of the King's Pictures from 1791 until his death.

The Death of General Wolfe

West painted his most famous, and possibly most influential painting, The Death of General Wolfe, in 1770 and it exhibited at the Royal Academy in 1771.  The painting became one of the most frequently reproduced images of the period.  It returned to the French and Indian War setting of his General Johnson Saving a Wounded French Officer from the Tomahawk of a North American Indian of 1768. When the American Revolution broke out in 1776 he remained ambivalent, and neither spoke out for or against the Revolutionary War in his land of birth.

West became known for his large scale history paintings, which use expressive figures, colours and compositional schemes to help the spectator to identify with the scene represented. West called this "epic representation". His 1778 work The Battle of the Boyne portrayed William of Orange's victory at the Battle of the Boyne in 1690, and strongly influenced subsequent images of William. In 1806 he produced The Death of Nelson, to commemorate Horatio Nelson's death at the Battle of Trafalgar.

Later religious painting

St Paul's Church, in the Jewellery Quarter, Birmingham, has an important enamelled stained glass east window made in 1791 by Francis Eginton, modelled on an altarpiece painted c. 1786 by West, now in the Dallas Museum of Art. It shows the Conversion of Paul. He was elected a Foreign Honorary Member of the American Academy of Arts and Sciences in 1791.

West is also well known for his huge work in the Chapel of St Peter and St Paul which now forms part of the Old Royal Naval College in Greenwich, London.  His work, The Preservation of St Paul after a Shipwreck at Malta, measures  and illustrates the Acts of the Apostles: 27 & 28.  West also provided the designs for the other paintings executed by Biagio Rebecca in the chapel.

Following a loss of royal patronage at the beginning of the 19th century, West began a series of large-scale religious works.  The first, Christ Healing the Sick was originally intended as a gift to Pennsylvania Hospital in Philadelphia; instead he sold it to the British Institution for £3,000, which in turn presented it to the National Gallery. West then made a copy to send to Philadelphia. The success of the picture led him to paint a series of even larger works, including his Death on the Pale Horse, exhibited in 1817.

Royal Academy
Though initially snubbed by Sir Joshua Reynolds, founding President of the Royal Academy, and by some other Academicians who felt he was over-ambitious, West was elected President of the Royal Academy on the death of Reynolds in 1792. He resigned in 1805, to be replaced by a fierce rival, architect James Wyatt. However West was again elected president the following year, and served until his death.

Pupils
Many American artists studied under him in London, including Ralph Earl and later his son, Ralph Eleaser Whiteside Earl, Samuel Morse, Robert Fulton, Charles Willson Peale, Rembrandt Peale, Matthew Pratt, Gilbert Stuart, John Trumbull, Washington Allston, Thomas Sully, John Green, and Abraham Delanoy.

Death
West died at his house in Newman Street in London,  on March 11, 1820, and was buried in St Paul's Cathedral. He had been offered a knighthood by the British Crown, but declined it, believing that he should instead be made a peer.

Gallery

Works
 John Sedley, view
 Portrait of a Gentleman, view
 Presentation of the Queen of Sheba at the Court of King Solomon, view
 The Envoys Returning from the Promised Land, view

Sources

 
 
 
 
 
  Reprinted in America's Old Masters (New York, 1967), pp. 315–40.

References

External links

 
The Winterthur Library Overview of an archival collection on Benjamin West.
Royal Academy Collections website Loyd Grossman talking about West's work
Union List of Artist Names, Getty Vocabularies. ULAN Full Record Display for Benjamin West. Getty Vocabulary Program, Getty Research Institute. Los Angeles, California.
 The Benjamin West Drawings Collection, including 33 of his drawings and sketches, is available for research use at the Historical Society of Pennsylvania.
Documenting the Gilded Age: New York City Exhibitions at the Turn of the 20th Century . A New York Art Resources Consortium project. Annotations and a pencil sketch of a West painting in an exhibition catalog.

.

18th-century American painters
18th-century American male artists
American male painters
19th-century American painters
18th-century English painters
English male painters
19th-century English painters
Royal Academicians
1738 births
1820 deaths
Surveyors of the Queen's Pictures
American history painters
People from Delaware County, Pennsylvania
People of colonial Pennsylvania
American portrait painters
Fellows of the American Academy of Arts and Sciences
19th-century American male artists
19th-century English male artists
Burials at St Paul's Cathedral
18th-century English male artists